Linus Hallenius (born 1 April 1989) is a Swedish professional footballer who plays as a striker for GIF Sundsvall.

Career
Born in Sundsvall, Hallenius started his professional career with GIF Sundsvall.

During the transfer period on the summer of 2009 there were rumors that Hallenius was close to sign for Örgryte IS and several news papers went out with the news that Örgryte IS had signed him, which was denied by the club. Although the fact was that the club had made an agreement with GIF Sundsvall, but Hallenius hesitated about the transfer. On 7 July 2009, Hallenius signed a 3.5-year contract with Hammarby IF in the Allsvenskan. During the autumn of 2009, Hallenius made 8 appearances of which he played 4 as a starter, but did not score a goal. Hammarby IF were relegated to Superettan. During the 2010 season, Hallenius scored 18 goals in 23 matches, including a goal away against Syrianska FC on 20 June 2010 which was described as "wonderful" and "fantastic" and which was compared to a famous Marco van Basten goal. It was voted second in the FIFA Puskás Award.

On 1 September 2010, Hallenius signed for Genoa who immediately loaned him back to Hammarby for the rest of the 2010 season. He joined up with his new teammates on 4 January 2011.

Career statistics

References

External links
 

1989 births
Living people
Association football forwards
Swedish footballers
Sweden under-21 international footballers
Sweden youth international footballers
Swedish expatriate footballers
GIF Sundsvall players
Hammarby Fotboll players
FC Lugano players
Genoa C.F.C. players
Calcio Padova players
FC Aarau players
Helsingborgs IF players
IFK Norrköping players
Allsvenskan players
Superettan players
Swiss Super League players
Swiss Challenge League players
Serie A players
Serie B players
Expatriate footballers in Switzerland
Expatriate footballers in Italy
People from Sundsvall
Sportspeople from Västernorrland County